The Pollexina are a subtribe of moths of the family Erebidae. The genus was erected by Michael Fibiger in 2007.

Taxonomy
The subtribe was originally described as the subfamily Pollexinae of the family Micronoctuidae.

Genera
Tolpia Walker, 1863
Disca Fibiger, 2007
Pollex Fibiger, 2007

References

Micronoctuini
Lepidoptera subtribes